The 2013–14 NOJHL season was the 36th season of the Northern Ontario Junior Hockey League (NOJHL). The seven teams of the NOJHL played 56-game schedules.

Come February, the top teams of each division will play down for the Copeland-McNamara Trophy, the NOJHL championship.  The winner of the Copeland-McNamara Trophy will compete in the Central Canadian Junior "A" championship, the Dudley Hewitt Cup.  If successful against the winners of the Ontario Junior Hockey League and Superior International Junior Hockey League, the champion would then move on to play in the Canadian Junior Hockey League championship, the 2014 Royal Bank Cup.

Changes 
Espanola Rivermen join league.

Current Standings 
Note: GP = Games played; W = Wins; L = Losses; OTL = Overtime losses; SL = Shootout losses; GF = Goals for; GA = Goals against; PTS = Points; x = clinched playoff berth; y = clinched division title; z = clinched conference title

Teams listed on the official league website.

Standings listed on official league website.

2014 Copeland-McNamara Trophy Playoffs

Playoff results are listed on the official league website.

Dudley Hewitt Cup Championship
Hosted by the Wellington Dukes in Wellington, Ontario.  The Kirkland Lake Gold Miners represented the NOJHL and finished fourth in the round robin.

Round Robin
Wellington Dukes (OJHL) 4 - Kirkland Lake Gold Miners 1
Toronto Lakeshore Patriots (OJHL) 4 - Kirkland Lake Gold Miners 1
Fort Frances Lakers (SIJHL) 6 - Kirkland Lake Gold Miners 3

Scoring leaders 
Note: GP = Games played; G = Goals; A = Assists; Pts = Points; PIM = Penalty minutes

Leading goaltenders 
Note: 1000 Minutes minimum; GP = Games played; Mins = Minutes played; W = Wins; L = Losses: OTL = Overtime losses; SL = Shootout losses; GA = Goals Allowed; SO = Shutouts; GAA = Goals against average

Awards
Top Defenceman (NOJHL Award) - 
Most Improved (Gilles Laperriere Trophy) - 
Top Defensive Forward (Mitch Tetreault Memorial Trophy) - 
Team Goaltending (NOJHL Award) - 
Top GAA (Wayne Chase Memorial Award) - 
Top Scorer (Jimmy Conners Memorial Trophy) - 
Most Valuable Player (Carlo Catterello Trophy) - 
Top Rookie (John Grignon Trophy) - 
Most Gentlemanly Player (Onaping Falls Huskies Trophy) - 
Top Team Player (NOJHL Trophy) - 
Scholastic Award (NOJHL Trophy) - 
CJHL Scholastic Nominee Award - 
Playoff's Most Valuable Player (NOJHL Trophy) - 
Coach of the Year (Mirl "Red" McCarthy Memorial Award) - 
Top Executive (Joe Drago Trophy) -

See also 
 2014 Royal Bank Cup
 Dudley Hewitt Cup
 List of NOHA Junior A seasons
 Ontario Junior Hockey League
 Superior International Junior Hockey League
 Greater Ontario Junior Hockey League
 2013 in ice hockey
 2014 in ice hockey

References

External links 
 Official website of the Northern Ontario Junior Hockey League
 Official website of the Canadian Junior Hockey League

N
2013